The United Kingdom and the British Broadcasting Corporation (BBC) held a national final titled "A Song for Europe 1981" to choose who would represent them in the Eurovision Song Contest 1981. "A Song for Europe 1981" was held on 11 March 1981 where Bucks Fizz was chosen with "Making Your Mind Up" as the entrant. At Eurovision, they placed first winning the competition with 136 points.

Before Eurovision

A Song for Europe 1981
The BBC reduced the number of finalists from twelve to eight in 1981. Terry Wogan hosted the contest on 11 March. It was held at the Television Theatre. 581 songs were submitted to the Music Publisher's Association to pick eight songs. The BBC Concert Orchestra under the direction of John Coleman as conductor accompanied all the songs, but all the music was pre-recorded. The show was the 16th most watched programme of the week with a rating of 12.4 million viewers, the highest for three years. Johnny Logan was scheduled to appear as a guest on the programme, but had to cancel shortly before the air date.

Seven regional juries voted on the songs. The regional juries voted internally and awarded 15 points to their favourite song, 12 points to the second, 10 points to the third and then 9, 8, 7, 6 and 5 points in order of preference for the songs from 4th to 8th. Before the reprise, Terry Wogan incorrectly read the title of the winning song as "Where Are You Now." The prizes were presented by Wogan to John Danter, one of the songwriters, and to Mike Nolan, one of the performers.

UK Discography 
Unusually for the UK competition, three of the finalists reached the UK Singles Chart. Making Your Mind Up spent three weeks at number one, whilst the runner-up, Don't Panic! reached number 42 at more-or-less the same time. Have You Ever Been in Love? was a UK no.10 hit for Leo Sayer in 1982, also reaching no.4 in Australia. The track was covered by many other artists, including Peter Cetera and Westlife. For Only A Day was later used as the theme song for the 1983 Miss World contest, performed live by all the contestants during the broadcast.

Gary Benson – All Cried Out: Warner Bros./WEA K17773.
Unity – For Only A Day: Epic A1066.
Beyond – Wish: Radioactive RAD102.
Bucks Fizz – Making Your Mind Up: RCA PB5339. 
Paris – Have You Ever Been in Love?: RCA PB5475.
Leo Sayer – Have You Ever Been in Love?: Chrysalis CHS2596 (1982).
Liquid Gold – Don't Panic'': Polo POLO12-8.

At Eurovision
1981 was the year that Bucks Fizz won the Eurovision Song Contest for the United Kingdom with their song "Making Your Mind Up". It received 136 points from the 19 juries, beating Germany's Lena Valaitis with the song "Johnny Blue".

Members of the British jury included Norman Harper, S. Andrew, David Bratt, P. Green, A. Harmann, J.P. Robinson, D. Ruteledge, S. Tapper, I. Tyler, G. Wallbank, and Conor E. Young.

Voting

References

External links
  Bucks Fizz Official Website

1981
Countries in the Eurovision Song Contest 1981
Eurovision
Eurovision